"In the Middle of the Night" is a song by German Eurodance band Magic Affair, released in July 1994 as the third single from their debut studio album, Omen (The Story Continues...) (1994). The raps are performed by American rapper AK Swift, and the lead vocals are sung by German singer Franca Morgano. The song peaked at number 10 in Finland, number 14 in Austria, and number 16 in both Germany and Sweden. On the Eurochart Hot 100, the song reached number 34 in September 1994.

Critical reception
Alan Jones from Music Week wrote, "Steamroller subtlety from the Teutonic techno team on a song with less substance than "The Omen", and following the well tried female singer/male rapper formula. A hit but probably not set for an extended run in the Top 40."

Music video
The accompanying music video for "In the Middle of the Night" was directed by Manuela Hiller and Oliver Sommer. It was A-listed on Germany's VIVA in September 1994.

Track listings

 7-inch, UK (1994)
 "In the Middle of the Night" (single edit) – 4:06
 "In the Middle of the Night" (Midnight club mix) – 6:10

 12-inch, Germany (1994)
 "In the Middle of the Night" (maxi edit) – 6:20
 "In the Middle of the Night" (Midnight club edit) – 6:10

 CD single, Germany (1994)
 "In the Middle of the Night" (single edit) – 4:06
 "In the Middle of the Night" (Maxi edit) – 6:20

 CD maxi-single, Germany (1994)
 "In the Middle of the Night" (single edit) – 4:06
 "In the Middle of the Night" (Maxi edit) – 6:20
 "In the Middle of the Night" (Midnight club edit) – 6:10

 CD maxi-single, UK (1994)
 "In the Middle of the Night" (club remix) – 4:57
 "In the Middle of the Night" (303 State mix) – 5:25
 "In the Middle of the Night" (Maxi edit) – 6:20
 "In the Middle of the Night" (Work Out mix) – 5:52
 "In the Middle of the Night" (Midnight club mix) – 6:10

 CD maxi-single (Remix), Germany (1994)
 "In the Middle of the Night" (club re-mix) – 4:57
 "In the Middle of the Night" (303 State mix) – 5:25
 "In the Middle of the Night" (Work Out mix) – 5:52

Charts

Weekly charts

Year-end charts

Release history

References

1994 singles
1994 songs
Electrola singles
EMI Records singles
Magic Affair songs
Music videos directed by Oliver Sommer